Squaw Peak may refer to:

Mountains
 Ch-paa-qn Peak, a mountain (formerly known as Squaw Peak) in Missoula County, Montana, United States
 Piestewa Peak, a mountain (formerly known as Squaw Peak) in the Phoenix Mountains range in Phoenix, Arizona, United States
 Beaver Mountain (New York) (formerly known as Squaw Mountain}, a mountain located in the Adirondack Mountains range of New York, United States
 Kyhv Peak (formerly known as Squaw Mountain [official] or Squaw Peak}, a mountain in the Wasatch Range in Provo, Utah, United States

Other uses
 Squaw Peak Inn, Piestewa Peak, Phoenix, Arizona, USA

See also

 Squaw Cap, New Brunswick, Canada; a mountain and unincorporated community
 Isanaklesh Peaks, Maricopa County, Arizona, USA; a mountain peak formerly known as Squaw Tits 
 Anû Kathâ Îpa, a mountain peak formerly known as Squaw's Tit in Alberta, Canada
 Squaw (disambiguation)
 Peak (disambiguation)